The Sauerländer Heimatbund (English: Sauerland Home Federation)  is a non-profit NGO in Germany. Their purpose is to adhere to and honour the cultural roots, heritage and traditions the Sauerland area. It was founded in 1921  in Meschede.

History
The organisation was founded by the Roman Catholic priest Franz Hoffmeister as a community of traditional students. Like similar organisations in Germany, it was founded because of the  experiences of World War I. During the Third Reich activities were interrupted. Specific aspects of Heimat — love and attachment to homeland and the rejection of anything foreign — left the idea vulnerable to easy assimilation into the fascist "blood and soil" literature of the National Socialists.

Bylaws
The registered voluntary association has over 3,000 members. As in all other German associations of this type, an annual meeting is compulsory. In the 21st century annual meetings were held in Balve (2004), Meschede (2005), Arnsberg (2006)  and Allendorf (2007),

Notable members
Theodor Pröpper (1896–1979), composer
Franz Lenze (1910–2005), politician
Friedhelm Ackermann (1934–2006), photographer
Werner Ahrens, designer

Chairman
 Elmar Reuter

Literature
 Landeskundliche Schriftenreihe für das kurkölnische Sauerland. Darin u.a.:
 Helmut Müller (Bearb.): Die Urkunden des Klosters Bredelar. Fredeburg, 1994.
 Manfred Wolf (Bearb.) : Die Urkunden des Klosters Oelinghausen : Regesten. Fredeburg, 1992
 Sauerland : Zeitschrift des Sauerländer Heimatbundes
 Erika Richter: 75 Jahre Sauerländer Heimatbund. In: Sauerland 29/1996. S.123-159
 Dieter Wurm: 85 Jahre Sauerländer Heimatbund. In: Sauerland 3/2006. S.107
 Sauerland, Zeitschrift des Sauerländer Heimatbundes, Publisher: Sauerländer Heimatbund

Notes

References

Non-profit organisations based in North Rhine-Westphalia
Westphalia culture
Organizations established in 1921
Sauerland
1921 establishments in Germany